Camilla was built in France in 1799 and was taken in prize by the British. Camillia first appeared in Lloyd's Register (LR) in 1800 with Caitchern, master, Swane & Co., owners, and trade London–Barbados. Captain Robert Hunter Caitchion acquired a letter of marque on 20 August 1800.

LL reported on 16 January 1801 that the French privateer Mouche had captured three vessels:
Camilla, Calcheon, master, sailing from London to Barbados;
, Pervis, master, Liverpool to Madeira; and
Elizabeth, Liverpool to Demerara.

The entry for Camilla in the 1801 volume of Lloyd's Register carried the annotation "Captured".

Notes, citations, and references
Notes

Citations

References
 

1799 ships
Ships built in France
Age of Sail merchant ships of England
Captured ships